Jac Maris (21 February 1900 – 5 April 1996) was a Dutch sculptor. His work was part of the sculpture event in the art competition at the 1936 Summer Olympics.

References

1900 births
1996 deaths
20th-century Dutch sculptors
Dutch male sculptors
Olympic competitors in art competitions
Artists from Magdeburg
20th-century Dutch male artists